Lome Fa'atau (born 23 October 1975 in Wellington, New Zealand) is a rugby union player. The speedy winger is recognisable by his traditional Samoan tattoo (pe'a).
Before his rugby career took off, he attended St. Patrick's College in Wellington, where he was a star basketball player for his college team. It was not until he left college did he begin playing rugby union for the local club Marist St. Pat's, where he made his debut in the third grade division at fullback.

Career 
He made his provincial debut in the 1999 season of the National Provincial Championship in New Zealand, playing for Wellington. The next year he joined Taranaki and became the leading try scorer for the province that season. The following year he returned to his old province in Wellington. In 2002 he played for the Hurricanes in the international Super 12 competition. Two years later he joined the Chiefs before returning to the Hurricanes.

He made his debut for Manu Samoa in 2002. Fa'atau played on the wing in all matches for Samoa in the 2003 World Cup in Australia, except for the match against Georgia, Fa'atau scored one try during the World Cup. Fa'atau describes his best rugby memory as making the Manu Samoa team.

The Hurricanes made it to the 2006 Super 14 final, where they went down to the Crusaders in bizarre weather. Although not finishing as champions, Fa'atau was not only the top try scorer for the Hurricanes, but the lead try scorer of the season amassing a total a grand total of 10 tries through a combination of graceful, elusive yet blisteringly fast running.

Fa'atau joined Scottish side Glasgow after the 2007 Rugby World Cup.

After an indifferent two seasons with Glasgow he joined Nice who play in Federale 1 in France, and plays with former internationals Dan Luger, Ross Beattie, Kevin Yates and Mark McHugh, and England coach Martin Johnson's brother Will Johnson who used to play for Leicester Tigers.

Personal life 
Lome is also a committed Christian and wears the initial "J" and "C" (for Jesus Christ) on his wristbands every match.

His brother Eneliko (Ene) Fa'atau also plays rugby and is the player/coach for the Irish Leinster league division club Dundalk.

References

Lome is currently coaching Percy Park RFC in North Shields, Tyne & Wear. He also plays local league basketball for North Shields Tropic.

External links
Glasgow profile

1975 births
Living people
Rugby union wings
Samoan rugby union coaches
Samoan rugby union players
Glasgow Warriors players
Rugby union players from Wellington City
New Zealand sportspeople of Samoan descent
Samoa international rugby union players
Pacific Islanders rugby union players
Samoan expatriate rugby union players
Expatriate rugby union players in Scotland
Expatriate rugby union players in Italy
Samoan expatriate sportspeople in New Zealand
Expatriate rugby union players in New Zealand
Samoan expatriate sportspeople in Scotland
Samoan expatriate sportspeople in Italy
People educated at St. Patrick's College, Wellington
Samoa international rugby sevens players
Male rugby sevens players